Chromosphaera perkinsii is a species of Ichthyosporea from the order Dermocystida. Named after Professor Frank Perkins, it was isolated in shallow marine sediments in Hawaii by Stuart Donachie and collaborators. It is a rare case of a putatively free-living ichthyosporean, and possibly the only free-living dermocystid.

References

Mesomycetozoea